Felix Gross may refer to:
 Feliks Gross (1906 - 2006), Polish-American sociologist
 Felix Groß (born 1998), German cyclist
 Felix Gross (musician), American musician and composer